Alexander Moon (born 6 September 1996) is an English professional rugby union player who plays as a lock for Premiership club Northampton Saints.

Background
Moon began playing rugby during his time at St Joseph's College, Ipswich where he studied from age five to fifteen. He earned a three-year scholarship to Sedbergh School to complete his A Levels and further his rugby development.

Moon comes from a strong rugby family with his father, Jon, coaching Ipswich rugby club and aunt, Vickie, a former physiotherapist for Leeds Rhinos and Yorkshire Carnegie. His uncle played for the rugby league side, Bradford Bulls.

Club career
In 2015 Northampton Saints confirmed that Moon would join their senior academy and he was subsequently awarded a senior academy contract at the start of the 2015/16 season. In November 2016 he made his senior club debut against Newcastle Falcons in the Anglo-Welsh Cup. Moon was also a member of the Northampton Wanderers side that beat Gloucester United 36–15 to win the 2017 Premiership A League and Exeter Braves the following season to retain the title.

In February 2019 Moon signed his first professional senior contract with the Saints and later that season started for the Northampton side that defeated Saracens in the final of the Premiership Rugby Cup.

International career
Moon represented the England under-20 team in the 2016 Six Nations Under 20s Championship. In January 2020 Moon received his first call-up to the senior England squad for the 2020 Six Nations Championship.

References

1996 births
Living people
English rugby union players
Northampton Saints players
People educated at Sedbergh School
People educated at St Joseph's College, Ipswich
Rugby union locks
Rugby union players from Ipswich